Alexandru Gabriel Georgescu (born 10 July 2001) is a Romanian professional footballer who plays as a defender for Liga III side Gloria Bistrița-Năsăud, on loan from Farul Constanța.

Career statistics

Club

References

External links
 
 

2001 births
Living people
Sportspeople from Slatina, Romania
Romanian footballers
Romania youth international footballers
Association football midfielders
Liga I players
Liga III players
FC Viitorul Constanța players
FCV Farul Constanța players
CS Gloria Bistrița-Năsăud footballers